This list of secondary schools in Northern Cyprus includes active academic institutions providing secondary education in Northern Cyprus by their types.

Middle schools
For the extended list of middle schools in Northern Cyprus, see list of middle schools in Northern Cyprus.

Public
Source:

Public schools are owned by the state and governed by the Ministry of Education and Culture. There is no tuition fee for public schools.

General high schools
These schools follow the national curriculum set by the Ministry of Education and Culture and prepare students for Yükseköğretim Kurumları Sınavı. All of the listed regular high schools have middle school sections if not stated otherwise. The schools admit students loosely from their feeder primary or middle schools in respect to their regions. High schools provide the 4 years of the 12-year school education from year 9 to year 12. The schools with middle school sections provide the 3 years from year 6 to year 8.

 Anafartalar Lisesi
 Bekirpaşa Lisesi
 Cumhuriyet Lisesi
 Değirmenlik Lisesi
 Erenköy Lisesi
 Kurtuluş Lisesi
 Lapta Yavuzlar Lisesi
 Lefke Gazi Lisesi
 Lefkoşa Türk Lisesi
 Namık Kemal Lisesi
 Polatpaşa Lisesi

Maarif kolejleri
The following schools are modelled after Türk Maarif Koleji, providing the English curriculum and preparing students for the International General Certificate of Secondary Education and the GCE Advanced Level examinations. However, students are allowed to follow the Turkish curriculum from Year 10 if they choose to prepare for Yükseköğretim Kurumları Sınavı. The schools admit students achieving top scores from the Kolej Giriş Sınavları held during their senior primary school year. Maarif kolejleri provide the last 7 years of the 12-year school education from year 6 to year 12.

 19 Mayıs Türk Maarif Koleji	
 Gazimağusa Türk Maarif Koleji
 Güzelyurt Türk Maarif Koleji
 Türk Maarif Koleji

Anatolian high schools
The following schools are modelled after Turkish anatolian high schools and Turkish Cypriot maarif kolejleri. Bülent Ecevit Anadolu Lisesi (BEAL) provides both Turkish and English curricula and prepare students for Yükseköğretim Kurumları Sınavı, the International General Certificate of Secondary Education and the GCE Advanced Level examinations according to their preferences. Anadolu Güzel Sanatlar Lisesi (AGSL) only prepares students according to the Turkish curriculum, while training the students in fine arts at the same time.

BEAL admits students achieving top scores from the Yönlendirme Sınavı held after their year 8. AGSL admits students who successfully pass musical auditions prior to year 6 or year 9 and students who pass an art exam prior to year 9.

AGSL provides the last 7 years of the 12-year school education from year 6 to year 12, while BEAL only provides the last 4 years of the 12-year school education from year 9 to year 12.

Bülent Ecevit Anadolu Lisesi

Anatolian fine arts schools
 Anadolu Güzel Sanatlar Lisesi

Science high schools
 20 Temmuz Fen Lisesi

Vocational high schools
 Karpaz Meslek Lisesi	
 Atatürk Meslek Lisesi	
 Gazimağusa Meslek Lisesi
 Haspolat Meslek Lisesi	 
 Güzelyurt Meslek Lisesi

Technical high schools
 Sedat Simavi Endüstri Meslek Lisesi
 Cengiz Topel Endüstri Meslek Lisesi
 Dr. Fazıl Küçük Endüstri Meslek Lisesi

Commercial high schools
 Haydarpaşa Ticaret Lisesi	
 Gazimağusa Ticaret Lisesi
 İskele Ticaret Lisesi

Divinity high schools
 Hala Sultan İlahiyat Koleji

Tourism high schools
 Girne Turizm Meslek Lisesi

Other
Source:

All of the listed institutions also have middle school sections, providing the final 7 years of the 12-year school education from year 6 to year 12. Some of the following schools may also have pre-school and primary school sections.

 Doğu Akdeniz Doğa Koleji
 Εξατάξιου Γυμνασίου Ριζοκαρπάσου-Dipkarpaz Rum Ortaokulu (Exataxiou Gymnasiou Rizokarpasou/Rizokarpaso High School)
 Future Amerikan Koleji
 Girne Amerikan Koleji
 Levent Koleji
 Necat British College
 The English School of Kyrenia
 TED Kuzey Kıbrıs Koleji
 Yakın Doğu Koleji

See also
 Education in Northern Cyprus
 Lists of schools

External links
 Ministry of Education and Culture webpage

References 

Northern Cyprus education-related lists
Buildings and structures in Northern Cyprus by type
Education in Northern Cyprus
Organisations based in Northern Cyprus
Cyprus education-related lists
Lists of buildings and structures in Cyprus
Schools in North secondary schools
Northern Cyprus secondary schools
Northern Cyprus secondary schools
Northern Cyprus secondary schools

Lists of organisations based in Northern Cyprus